Psammotis orientalis is a moth in the family Crambidae. It was described by Eugene G. Munroe and Akira Mutuura in 1968. It is found on the island of Hokkaido in Japan and in Russia.

References

Pyraustinae
Moths described in 1968
Moths of Asia
Taxa named by Eugene G. Munroe
Taxa named by Akira Mutuura